U-32 (S182) is a Type 212A submarine of the German Navy, the second of her class to enter service.

U-32 was built by the German Submarine Consortium at the shipyards of Thyssen Nordseewerke of Emden and Howaldtswerke-Deutsche Werft at Kiel. She was launched on 4 December 2003, and was commissioned in a joint ceremony with her sister ship  by the German Minister of Defence, Peter Struck, in Eckernförde on 19 October 2005. U-32 is propelled by one diesel engine and an electric motor driven by two fuel cells and features a cavitation-free screw, making her virtually undetectable. U-32 was the first non-nuclear submarine to stay submerged for two weeks.

Korvettenkapitän Michael Bornholt is U-32s commanding officer.

In March 2013, U-32 crossed the Atlantic Ocean to participate in exercises on the east coast of the United States. During the journey, the submarine remained submerged for 18 days, the longest of any German submarine at the time.

References

Bibliography

Type 212 submarines of the German Navy
Ships built in Emden
Ships built in Kiel
2003 ships
Submarines of Germany
Attack submarines